Laurel High School is a public school in Laurel, Mississippi, United States, part of the Laurel School District. The school provides education to grades 9–12.

Notable alumni
 Akeem Davis – Cornerbacks coach at University of Southern Mississippi, former National Football League (NFL) safety
 BoPete Keyes – Cornerback for the Kansas City Chiefs of the NFL
 Tom Lester – Actor
 Parker Posey - Actor
 Mary Elizabeth Ellis - Actor
 Charles Cross - Offensive tackle for the Seattle Seahawks of the NFL
 Dontario Drummond - Wide receiver for the Dallas Cowboys of the NFL

References

Public high schools in Mississippi
Schools in Jones County, Mississippi
Public middle schools in Mississippi